The Royal Military Chapel, commonly known as the Guards' Chapel, is a British Army place of worship that serves as the religious home of the Household Division at the Wellington Barracks in Westminster, Greater London. Completed in 1838 in the style of a Greek temple and re-designed during the 1870s, the first chapel on the site was damaged by German bombing during the Blitz in 1940 and 1941.

On Sunday, 18 June 1944, the chapel was hit again, this time by a V-1 flying bomb, during the morning service. The explosion of the bomb collapsed the concrete roof onto the congregation, which left 121 people killed and 141 injured (both military and civilian).

Using the memorials from the old chapel as foundations, a new chapel was built in a Modernist style in 1963. In 1970 the building was made a Grade II* listed building.

The Flanders Fields Memorial Garden, dedicated to the memory of Guardsmen lost in the First World War, was opened by Queen Elizabeth II in 2014 and occupies land next to the chapel.

On the last Tuesday of each month, except in August, the chapel hosts a free 45-minute lunchtime concert featuring a wide variety of music.

The Order of the Garter Banner of FM Lord Alexander of Tunis was transferred from St George's Chapel, Windsor Castle, to the Guards' Chapel following his death in 1969.

References

Bibliography

External links
 
 
 Guards Chapel bombed by V1 on Sunday, 18 June 1944 – with photos

1944 in London
Churches bombed by the Luftwaffe in London
Buildings and structures in the United Kingdom destroyed during World War II
Chapels in London
Church of England church buildings in the City of Westminster
Guards Division (United Kingdom)
G. E. Street buildings
Grade II* listed churches in the City of Westminster
Attacks on religious buildings and structures during World War II